Blue Origin Goddard is the name of the first development vehicle in Blue Origin's New Shepard program, which flew for the first time on November 13, 2006. Named after rocketry pioneer Robert H. Goddard, the vehicle is a subscale demonstrator and flew up to a height of about  during its initial flight. The private spacecraft venture is being funded by the billionaire founder Jeff Bezos.

Rob Meyerson led Blue Origin from 2003 to 2017 and served as its first president.

Overview
The Goddard rocket used 9 BE-1 engines, and is a single stage sub-orbital test vehicle. A video, filmed on November 13, 2006, from the Corn Ranch spaceport shows the first craft to launch under the New Shepard program. The vehicle climbed for approximately 10 seconds, reaching a height of roughly  before starting to descend, and making a controlled landing back on its landing legs approximately 25 seconds after take-off.

This flight marked the first time the company's founder, Jeff Bezos, broke his silence on the work of the space company. On the company's website, Bezos said: "We're working, patiently and step-by-step, to lower the cost of spaceflight [...] Accomplishing this mission will take a long time, and we're working on it methodically." Bezos founded Blue Origin in 2000 with the intention of developing a vertical take-off and landing vehicle, able to carry passengers to the edge of space. This would eventually come in the form of the New Shepard rocket, which made its debut flight in 2015. Then on July 20, 2021, New Shepard flew its first crewed flight which included Bezos as one of the crew members.

The vehicle made three flights. The second flight took place on March 22, 2007, and its third and final flight on April 19, 2007.

See also
 CORONA
 Kankoh-maru
 Lunar Lander Challenge
 Project VR-190
 Project Morpheus NASA program to continue developing ALHAT and Q­ landers
 Reusable Vehicle Testing program by JAXA
 SpaceShipTwo
 SpaceX reusable launch system development program
 XCOR Lynx
 Zarya

References

External links
Images of the vehicle and the launch

Blue Origin launch vehicles
Space tourism
Private spaceflight
2000s United States experimental aircraft
VTVL rockets